Judes Point is a settlement in northwestern Prince Edward Island.  It is situated approximately 3 km east of Tignish.

Communities in Prince County, Prince Edward Island